Jaakko Itälä (1933–2017) was a Finnish politician. He served as the minister of education for two terms in the 1970s. He was also a member of the Parliament and head of the Liberal People's Party.

Biography
Itälä was born in Porvoo on 7 May 1933. In the 1960s he became the general secretary of the school reform committee which developed a model for the elementary schools and headed the committee in late 1960s. During his term he contributed to the basic education reform in Finland. In 1968 Itälä was named as executive director of the Mannerheim Children's Protection Association.

He served as minister of education for two terms: from 1970 to 1971 and from 1978 to 1979. He was elected to the Parliament in 1979 obtaining the second highest vote nationwide in the elections. He served at the Parliament until 1983. He led the Liberal People's Party between 1978 and 1982.

He was married to Helena Itälä, and they had two children. He died in Helsinki on 9 November 2017.

References

External links

1933 births
2017 deaths
Ministers of Education of Finland
Leaders of political parties in Finland
People from Porvoo
Liberals (Finland) politicians
Members of the Parliament of Finland (1979–83)